Essozimna Marguerite Gnakade is a Togolese politician. On 1 October 2020 she was appointed defence minister in Togo, the first woman to hold that role.

Gnadake does not have previous military experience. She was the wife of Ernest Gnassingbé, the deceased brother of Togo's president Faure Gnassingbé.

References

Year of birth missing (living people)
Living people
Government ministers of Togo
Women government ministers of Togo
Female defence ministers
21st-century Togolese women politicians
21st-century Togolese politicians